Maciej Gracjan Zakościelny (born 7 May 1980, Stalowa Wola) is a Polish film, television and theatre actor.

Life and career
He was born on 7 May 1980 in Stalowa Wola. In 2004, he began his studies at the National Academy of Dramatic Art in Warsaw but didn't complete them. He began his acting career by appearing on TV series such as Plebania,  and Na dobre i na złe. He played his first major film role in Jerzy Hoffman's 2003 film An Ancient Tale: When the Sun Was a God. In 2004, he started performing at the Współczesny Theatre in Warsaw and joined the cast of the popular TV crime drama Kryminalni playing the character of Marek Brodecki. He appeared in Ryszard Zatorski's 2005 romantic comedy  (Just Love Me). Between 2008–2014, he starred in the historical television series Czas honoru playing the role of Bronek Woyciechowski, one of the Silent Unseens.

Personal life
He received an education in music and plays the violin. In 2009, he performed at the Jazz Jamboree Festival alongside singer Marianna Wróblewska and jazz pianist Beata Przybytek.

Since 2014, he has been in a relationship with model Paulina Wyka with whom he has two sons.

Appearances in film and television
2001–2002: Plebania as Marek Bednarek
2002–2004: Na dobre i na złe as Igor Kurowski
2002:  as Emil
2002:  as Antoni Knapik
2002:  as  Lipskiego
2002:  as  Lipskiego
2003: An Ancient Tale: When the Sun Was a God as Wramot
2004–2008: Kryminalni as  Marek Brodecki
2005: ... as Janek
2006:  as Michał
2007:  as Jan
2007: Nightwatching as Egremont
2008:  as secretary
2008–2014: Czas honoru as Bronek Woyciechowski
2012:  as Adam Morawski
2012: Prawo Agaty as Konrad Nałęcz (episode 24)
2015:  as Adam Wojnar
2015:  as Robert "Redo" Bartosiewicz
2016:  as Kordian
2017:  as Grzegorz
2017: Music, War and Love as Lukas
2017–2019:  as doctor Michał Wolski
2018: Dywizjon 303.  as Jan Zumbach
2019:  as Piotr Wolański
2020:  as Olo

See also
Polish cinema
Polish Film Awards

References

1980 births
Living people
Polish male actors
Polish male television actors
People from Stalowa Wola